Hoya archboldiana is a species in the genus Hoya. It was discovered in Papua New Guinea in 1933. It is cultivated as an ornamental plant, requiring protection in temperate climates, where it may be used as a houseplant. , The Plant List regarded Hoya archboldiana as an unresolved name.

References

archboldiana
Flora of Papua New Guinea
Plants described in 1937